Taiyangping Township is a rural township in Jingzhou Miao and Dong Autonomous County, Hunan, China. It is surrounded by Huitong County on the north and northwest, Aoshang Town on the west, Gantang Town on the east, and Quyang Town on the south.

Administrative division
As of 2017, the township is divided into 14 villages: Taiyangoing, Guanbaodu, Zhuge, Longtou, Jintan, Gucun, Shaxi, Xinjian, Xingzhai, Balong, Tuxi, Jilizhai, Dimang, and Zhuzhai.

Geography
It belongs to the subtropical seasonal climate. The climate is mild, the rain is abundant and the seasons are distinct.

The Zongchong Reservoir is the largest body of water in the township.

The Qushui River winds through the township.

Economy
Agriculture here is dominated by rice, watermelon, citrus, pear, myrica and chestnut.

Education
There is a middle school and ten primary schools in the whole township.

Transportation
The National Highway G209 passes across the township south to north.

The G65 Baotou–Maoming Expressway is a north-south highway in the township.

The Jiaozuo–Liuzhou railway passes across the town north to south.

References

Townships of Huaihua
Jingzhou Miao and Dong Autonomous County